Michael Albert Palardy (born July 6, 1992) is an American football punter for the New England Patriots of the National Football League (NFL). He played college football at Tennessee and was signed by the Oakland Raiders as an undrafted free agent in 2014. He has also been a member of the St. Louis Rams, Toronto Argonauts, Baltimore Ravens, Indianapolis Colts, Cleveland Browns, Atlanta Falcons, and Carolina Panthers.

College career
Palardy attended the University of Tennessee, where he played on the Tennessee Volunteers football team from 2010 to 2013 under head coaches Derek Dooley and Butch Jones. During his time with the Volunteers, Palardy had roles as the placekicker and punter.

As a freshman in 2010, Palardy converted 13 of 14 extra point attempts and 5 of 7 field goal attempts. In addition, he had four punts for 157 yards for a 39.3 average. As a sophomore in 2011, he converted 25 of 26 extra point attempts and 9 of 14 field goal attempts. In addition, he had 14 punts for 515 net yards for a 36.8 average. As a junior in 2012, he converted 37 of 40 extra point attempts and 9 of 12 field goal attempts. In addition, he had 36 punts for 1,551 net yards for a 43.1 average. On October 19, 2013, against the No. 11 South Carolina Gamecocks, Palardy hit a game-winning 19-yard field goal as time expired to give the Volunteers their first win over a ranked opponent in several years. As a senior in 2013, he converted 34 of 35 extra point attempts and 14 of 17 field goal attempts.

Professional career

Oakland Raiders
After going undrafted in the 2014 NFL Draft, Palardy signed with the Oakland Raiders on June 5, 2014. On August 7, 2014, he was waived. Palardy was signed to the Raiders' practice squad on December 24, 2014.

St. Louis Rams
On January 6, 2015, Palardy was signed by the St. Louis Rams. He was waived on September 1, 2015.

Toronto Argonauts
Palardy was signed by the Toronto Argonauts on September 19, 2015. On March 30, 2016, he was released. While with the Argonauts, he was teammates with fellow kicker Justin Palardy, who was also signed by the team in September. They are not related.

Carolina Panthers
On April 4, 2016, Palardy was signed by the Carolina Panthers. He was waived on June 7, 2016.

Baltimore Ravens
Palardy was signed by the Baltimore Ravens on July 30, 2016. On August 3, 2016, he was released.

Indianapolis Colts
On August 6, 2016, Palardy was signed by the Indianapolis Colts. He was waived on August 15, 2016.

Cleveland Browns
Palardy was signed by the Cleveland Browns on August 30, 2016. On September 3, 2016, he was waived. Palardy was signed to the Browns' practice squad on September 5, 2016. On September 22, 2016, he was released.

Atlanta Falcons
On October 4, 2016, Palardy was signed to the Atlanta Falcons' practice squad. He was waived on October 11, 2016.

Carolina Panthers (second stint)
Palardy was signed by the Panthers on November 14, 2016 after Andy Lee was placed on injured reserve. He made his NFL debut against the New Orleans Saints in Week 11. He recorded six punts for 280 net yards for a 46.67 average. Overall, in the 2016 season, he finished with 36 punts for 1,531 net yards for a 42.53 average.

In 2017, Palardy won the Panthers' punting job after the Panthers released Lee during final roster cuts. Overall, in the 2017 season, he finished with 71 punts for 3,268 net yards for a 46.03 average.

On April 16, 2018, Palardy signed his exclusive rights tender, staying with the Panthers for the 2018 season. On October 2, 2018, Palardy signed a three-year contract extension with the Panthers through the 2021 season.

On July 28, 2020, Palardy was placed on the reserve/non-football injury list (NFI) after suffering a torn ACL in the offseason. He was placed on the reserve/COVID-19 list by the team on December 7, 2020, and moved back to the NFI list on December 11. He was released on February 19, 2021.

Miami Dolphins 
Palardy signed a one-year contract with the Miami Dolphins on March 15, 2021. In Week 13, Palardy had six punts, with a long of 65, including three landing inside the 20-yard line in a 20-9 win over the New York Giants, earning AFC Special Teams Player of the Week.

New England Patriots 
On October 27, 2022, Palardy was hosted for a workout with the New England Patriots, following a poor performance from Jake Bailey the previous game. On November 1, Palardy signed with the Patriots' practice squad. He was promoted to the active roster on November 19, 2022 following an injury to Bailey.

References

External links
 Carolina Panthers bio
 Indianapolis Colts bio 
 Tennessee Volunteers bio

1992 births
Living people
St. Thomas Aquinas High School (Florida) alumni
People from Margate, Florida
American football punters
Tennessee Volunteers football players
Oakland Raiders players
St. Louis Rams players
Toronto Argonauts players
Carolina Panthers players
Baltimore Ravens players
Indianapolis Colts players
Cleveland Browns players
Atlanta Falcons players
Miami Dolphins players
Players of American football from Florida
New England Patriots players